Volleyball events were contested at the 1977 Summer Universiade in Sofia, Bulgaria.

First round

Men's tournament

Top two teams from Groups A, C, and E advance to Group G of the second round, and top two teams from Groups B, D, and F advance to Group H of the second round.

Second round

Men's tournament 

Top two teams from each group advance to the semifinals.

Knockout stages

Men's tournament

Semifinals 

 Czechoslovakia 3-1 Soviet Union
 Bulgaria 3-1 South Korea

5-8th Classification 

 Romania 3-0 United States
 Cuba 3-1 Yugoslavia

9-12th Classification 

 Japan 3-2 Italy
 Brazil 3-0 Mexico

11th-place match 
Brazil 3-? Mexico

9th-place match 
Japan 3-? Italy

7th-place match 
Yugoslavia 3-2 United States

5th-place match 
Romania 3-1 Cuba

3rd Place Match 
South Korea 3-2 Soviet Union

Final 
Bulgaria 3-1 Czechoslovakia

Medal table

References
 Universiade volleyball medalists on HickokSports
 Men's results (todor66.com)
 Women's results (todor66.com)

U
1977 Summer Universiade
Volleyball at the Summer Universiade